Bernd Ritthammer (born 18 April 1987) is a German professional golfer.

Ritthammer turned professional in 2006 and played on the EPD Tour (now Pro Golf Tour) beginning in 2007. He won two EPD Tour events in 2009 and topped the Order of Merit, earning him his Challenge Tour card for 2010. He played on the Challenge Tour in 2010 and 2011 and earned his European Tour card for 2012 through qualifying school. In 2012, he played on both the European Tour and Challenge Tour, then dropped back to the Challenge Tour in 2013. He also picked up two more wins on the EPD Tour in 2013. He played on the Challenge Tour in 2014 and both Challenge and European Tours in 2015. In July 2016, he won his first Challenge Tour title at the Made in Denmark Challenge.

Amateur wins
2002 German Under-16 Championship

Professional wins (8)

Challenge Tour wins (3)

Pro Golf Tour wins (4)

Toro Tour wins (1)

Team appearances
Amateur
European Boys' Team Championship (representing Germany): 2004

See also
List of golfers to achieve a three-win promotion from the Challenge Tour
2011 European Tour Qualifying School graduates
2016 Challenge Tour graduates
2018 European Tour Qualifying School graduates

References

External links

German male golfers
European Tour golfers
Sportspeople from Munich
People from Gunzenhausen
Sportspeople from Middle Franconia
1987 births
Living people